The National Union of Students of France (Union nationale des étudiants de France or UNEF) is the largest national students' union in France. It is historically close to the Socialist Party, with many of its member joining the party after leaving student life. 

It works to represent the interest of students for national and local governments, political parties, the government bodies concerned with higher education and their administration of the universities. The organisation is also active on the international arena.

History

1907: UNEF foundation by the merging of many AGEs (Associations Générales d'Étudiants, Students' General Associations) from different towns at a meeting held in Lille

1946: Adoption of the Charter of Grenoble which define the student as a "young intellectual worker". Since then, the UNEF has considered itself to be a part of the labour movement. The creation in France of the students' social security and welfare systems are the result of UNEF activism

1950s: The UNEF led the protest for independence of Algeria

1968: May 68 revolt. On 27 May the meeting of the UNEF, most outstanding of the events of May 68, proceeds and gathers 30.000 to 50.000 people in the Stade Sebastien Charlety.

1971 to 2001: The UNEF was split between UNEF-SE (Solidarité Étudiante, Students' solidarity) (linked to the French Communist Party) and UNEF-US (Unité Syndicale, Union Unity), which later evolved into UNEF-ID (Indépendante et Démocratique, Independence and democracy) (linked to the Internationalist Communist Organisation and close to the Socialist Party).

1986: The UNEFs led a victorious strike against student fees and selection at college admission

1995: Major protests against a government project of minimum wage for youth lower than for other salaries

2001: The UNEFs eventually reunified under the name 'UNEF'.

2001: Yassir Fichtali elected new chairman

2005: Bruno Julliard elected new chairman

2006: The UNEF played a major role in students' contestation of the prime minister Dominique de Villepin's Contrat première embauche.

2007: Jean-Baptiste Prévost elected new chairman

2011: Emmanuel Zemmour elected new chairman

2014: William Martinet elected new chairman

2016: Lilâ Le Bas elected new chairman

2019: Mélanie Luce elected new chairman

Democracy

Today, the UNEF is still composed of the different AGEs. There is one AGE in each town where a university is located, except in Paris, where there is an AGE by university. Membership is individual: every student can choose to join the AGE of his/her home town.

The UNEF holds a national conference every two years. National conference is the sovereign body of the UNEF and decide the UNEF policy.

Conferences are contested by factions:
 Majorité Nationale (National Majority): 80% of the votes in 2007
 Tendance pour une UNEF Unitaire et Démocratique (For a unitarian and democratic UNEF): 13%
 Tendance Refondation Syndicale (Union's refoundation): 7%

The conference also elects an administrative commission (Commission Administrative) to be the UNEF 'parliament' between conferences. The commission elects the National Board, the executive body.

Creation

The UNEF has created many national federations:
 CECED (Comité Étudiant Contre l'Extrême Droite, Students' Committee against Far Right)
 FERUF (Fédération des Étudiants en Résidences Universitaires de France, Resident Students Federation)
 UCEF (Union des Coopératives Étudiantes de France, Union of Students' Cooperatives)
 FENEC (Fédération Nationale des Étudiants Chercheurs)

The UNEF has also participated in the creation of different bodies related to students:
 MNEF, then replaced by LMDE in 2000 (La Mutuelle Des Etudiants) which operates the students' social security system
 ESIB in 1981, named ESU in 2007 (European Students Union)

Sexual violence

In the international background of allegations against Harvey Weinstein by The New York Times and The New Yorker, the French daily newspaper Le Monde published in November 2017 two detailed articles on alleged sexual harassment and predation supported by former UNEF presidents, Jean-Baptiste Prévost and Emmanuel Zemmour. In an editorial, more than 80 UNEF female members and militants have come forward to accuse the Union of "sexual violence". In December 2017, the president of the UNEF chapter in Nice, Paul Morançay resigned for covering up rape claims. Most members of the chapter have since resigned.

In spite of multiple "pressions", the daily newspaper Libération published in February 2018 a long article with sixteen testimonies  of female activists who have suffered from rape, sexual harassment and abuse within the organisation.

Segregation 
UNEF has been the subject of controversy in 2021 when its president said during a radio interview that the union was holding meetings where white people were not allowed.

References

External links
Official site of the UNEF
ESU Website

Students' unions in France
1907 establishments in France
Student organizations established in 1907
Union Nationale des Étudiants de France